The Southern Branch of the National Palace Museum (NPMSB) is a museum in Taibao City, Chiayi County, Taiwan.

History
To improve the cultural equity between Northern Taiwan and Southern Taiwan, the Executive Yuan approved the construction of the southern branch of National Palace Museum on 31 December 2004 as the Asian Arts and Culture Museum. The museum main building groundbreaking ceremony was held on 6 February 2013 hosted by President Ma Ying-jeou and the beam-raising ceremony was held on 5 June 2014 hosted by Vice President Wu Den-yih. The museum was opened for trial on 28 December 2015. In mid April 2016, the museum was closed due to reparation work of water leakage in its main hall building. The museum was then reopened on 23 August 2016.

Architecture

The 70-hectare museum was constructed at a cost of NT$7.934 billion. It consists of the main building, landscape bridge and park view. The main contractor for the construction was Lee Ming Construction for the main building and Progressive Environment Inc. Co. for the park.

The museum's main building spreads over an area of 20 hectares. The building's shape  was designed to invoke the three classical brush forms of ink painting. It consists of the Moyun Hall and Feibai Hall. The three shapes of brush also represents three ancient Asian civilization, which are China, India and Persia. The main entrance to the building ground floor has an elevation of 11 meters. It is also a certified green building.

It is a single span steel arch bridge. It consists of 25 curved ribs with various lengths and angles.

The museum park spans over an area of 50 hectares. It consists of the Waterscape Garden, Tropical Garden and Festival Garden. It also features a bird-viewing platform, memorial stone for the museum establishment, waterfront stage etc.

Exhibitions
The museum consists of permanent exhibition and temporary exhibition sections. It also includes the children's creative center.

Events
 Indian Festival of Light
 Muslim Culture Day

Facilities
Opened on 21 December 2017, the museum opened a Muslim prayer room, the first of such opening in a Taiwanese museum.

Transportation
The museum is accessible by bus from Chiayi Station of Taiwan High Speed Rail.

See also
 List of museums in Taiwan

References

External links

 

2015 establishments in Taiwan
Museums established in 2015
Museums in Chiayi County
National museums of Taiwan